Ruellia incomta (syn. Dipteracanthus incomtus Nees, Eurychanes incomta (Nees) Lindau) is a plant native to the Cerrado vegetation of Brazil.

References

incomta
Flora of Brazil